The Zeppelin Rammer was a design proposal by Luftschiffbau Zeppelin intended to use aerial ramming against the allied bombers  attacking Nazi Germany during World War II.

Description
A rocket-powered small aircraft with straight, constant-chord wings, the aircraft was to be towed or carried aloft by another aircraft and released when near enemy bombers. Igniting a Schmidding 533 solid-fuel rocket engine, it was to make a first attacking pass using the 14 nose-mounted R4M 55 mm   rockets, before attempting to ram the enemy bomber's wings or tail. The aircraft was expected to survive the ramming of the bomber, owing to the strength of its wing which had a steel leading edge. It would have landed on a retractable skid.

Owing to the high risk for the pilot inherent in its operation this aircraft is sometimes referred to as a suicide weapon, however it was originally not intended as such.  After January 1945 an order for sixteen prototypes was placed but the Zeppelin factory was subsequently destroyed by bombers, ending all work on the project.

See also

References

External links 
Flying rams
Zeppelin Rammer model (in Russian)

Rocket-powered aircraft
1940s German experimental aircraft
Research and development in Nazi Germany
Abandoned military aircraft projects of Germany